Hugh Kelley may refer to:

Hugh Kelley (screenwriter) of Cage (film) and Warriors of Virtue
Captain Hugh A. Kelley, namesake of Kelley Massif

See also
Hugh Kelly (disambiguation)